This list contains the names of albums that contain a hidden track and also information on how to find them. Not all printings of an album contain the same track arrangements, so some copies of a particular album may not have the hidden track(s) listed below. Some of these tracks may be hidden in the pregap, and some hidden simply as a track following the listed tracks. The list is ordered by artist name using the surname where appropriate.

 M83:
 M83 on the North American re-release has an untitled track following almost five minutes of silence after "I'm Happy, She Said."
 Dead Cities, Red Seas & Lost Ghosts Has an untitled song plays following a silence after "Beauties Can Die."
 M.I.A., Arular: After a short silence at the end of "Galang," there's an additional song—"M.I.A.."
 Mac DeMarco:
 Salad Days: There is a short message from Mac DeMarco after a short silence at the end of "Jonny's Odyssey", who says "Hi, guys, this is Mac, thank you for joining me, see again soon, bye bye."
 Here Comes the Cowboy: The final track "Bye Bye Bye" ends at 4:33, followed by 47 seconds of Japanese people's voices before "The Cattleman's Prayer" starts.
 Amy Macdonald, A Curious Thing: Track 12 contains a life version of "Dancing in the Dark" after a short silence (Starts at mark 6:02 of Track 12).
 Macabre: On the album "Murder Metal," the last track, named "Fritz Haarman der Metzger" is 13 minutes, and contains an unnamed hidden track.
 Madness, One Step Beyond...: On the original release, the unlisted song "Madness" is between tracks 13 ("Mummy's Boy") and 14 ("Chipmunks Are Go!").
 Madness, The Business - the Definitive Singles Collection: There is an unlisted introduction which takes up track 1 on CD1.
 Magalí Bachor: Magalí: After about 10 minutes after "Éste Momento," in her debut Album you can hear a nice remix of the second song, "Baby."
 The Maine: One Pack of Smokes from Broke: After some time after "Waiting for my Sun to Shine", in the album  "Pioneer".
 The Magic Numbers, Hymn For Her: Unlisted song appears after a pause following final track "Try"
 Man or Astro-man?, EEVIAC operational index and reference guide, including other modern computational devices: Final track, "Automated Liner Notes Sequence", is unlisted.
 Destroy All Astromen!: At the end of the album, well after the final track, a voice says (in an exaggerated Southern accent), "Boy, whatchu waitin' around for? There ain't no mystery track on this durn CD!"
 maNga, maNga: "Kal Yanimda 2" can be found after final track "Kapanis."
 Manic Street Preachers, Know Your Enemy: "We Are All Bourgeois Now" at 8:40 of the final track. It is a cover of a song by McCarthy and later featured on the B-sides and rarities compilation Lipstick Traces (A Secret History of Manic Street Preachers).
 Send Away the Tigers: A cover of John Lennon's "Working Class Hero" follows final track "Winterlovers."
 Journal for Plague Lovers: "Bag Lady" follows final track "Willam's Last Words."
 Mansun, Attack of the Grey Lantern: After the Dark Mavis, you will get early b-side, "An Open Letter to the Lyrical Trainspotter."
 Kleptomania: "The Dog from 2 Doors Down" follows a gap after "Good Intentions Heal the Soul"; on CD 3, after "Taxloss (Live)", 3 tracks are included: "Witness to an Opera", "Thief (Re-Recorded)" and "Wide Open Space (Mike Hunter Version)".
 Marduk, Nightwing: Track "Nightwing" is a hidden track and is not mentioned on the rear cover but there are lyrics in the booklet.
 Marillion, This Strange Engine: After a long silence after end of last song, Steve Hogarth can be heard laughing over piano intro to "Man of a Thousand Faces"
 Brave: On the vinyl double album, Side 4 has two grooves. Each contains a different ending according to where one drops the stylus on the record.
 Clutching at Straws and Afraid of Sunlight both have hidden tracks that can only be heard when played on a PC with an encryption that steers the webbrowser to the Marillion website.
 Marilyn Manson:
 Smells Like Children: Track 16 is untitled and unlisted.
 Antichrist Superstar: "Empty Sounds of Hate" can be found at track 99, and works as both a prologue and epilogue to the album when played on loop as it seems to extend from the final song "Man That You Fear" and leads into the first track, "Irresponsible Hate Anthem".
 Mechanical Animals: "Untitled" can be found if CD is played in a computer.
 Damian Marley, Halfway Tree: "And You Be Loved" is found after the end of "Stand a Chance"
 Laura Marling: On her debut album Alas, I Cannot Swim there is a hidden track of the same name during "Your Only Doll (Dora)".
 Marvin's Marvelous Mechanical Museum: the 15th song on the album, Hidden In The Sand, is hidden behind a locked groove.
 Sarah Masen, The Dreamlife of Angels: The hidden song "Longing Unknown" is hidden in the "minus track" of the first song, and can be found by rewinding approximately 3:30.
 Mass of Atoms, Enhance the Chaos: A cover of the Rheostatics' "Public Square" is the unlisted final track on the cassette. 
 Massacration, Gates of Metal Fried Chicken of Death: A techno remix of the song "Metal Massacre Attack (Aruê Aruô)" follows a 30-second gap after the album's final track, "Metal Bucetation".
 Mastodon, Blood Mountain: The album's last song, "Pendulous Skin", contains a secret "fan letter" from Josh Homme, who provided guest vocals on the album.
 Matchbook Romance, Voices: Untitled track at the end of the album
 Stories and Alibis: Tracks 12 through 83 are three to four seconds of scilence and once it reaches track 84, there is a hidden track with a man speaking, people laughing, and weird noises.
 Matchbox Twenty: :Mad Season: Orchestral reprise of "You Won't Be Mine" following the original track, approximately 7:45 in.
 More Than You Think You Are: "So Sad, So Lonely" after silence at the end of the album
 Kevin Max, Stereotype Be: "You" (starts at approximately 3:09 of track 14)
 The Imposter: "Letting Go" after silence at the end of "Fade to Red".
 Maxwell, Embrya (1998): A hidden track, "Gestation: Mythos", appears in the pregap of the first track.
 Brian May, Another World: After the last track a piano version of the song "Business" is played.
 Mayhem, Grand Declaration of War: It features hidden track situated in pregap before track 1.
 Edwin McCain, Misguided Roses: At the end of track 12, "Holy City", there is a long pause that leads into the hidden track "Through the Floor".
 Paul McCartney:
 McCartney: A seconds-long unlisted fragment of an unreleased track called "Suicide" plays during the final moments of "Hot as Sun/Glasses". The same track would be included in full as a bonus track on a 2011 reissue of the album.
 Wild Life: In this album there are two unlisted jamming tracks called "Bip Bop Link" after the end of "I Am Your Singer" and "Mumbo Link" after the closing track "Dear Friend".
 Band on the Run: After the closing track "Nineteen Hundred and Eighty Five," a brief reprise of the opening track "Band on the Run" plays.
 Off the Ground: After the end of the closing track "C'mon People," an unlisted track called "Cosmically Conscious" (a shorter edit of the longer version on the "Off The Ground" single) is played.
 Driving Rain: The album contains an uncredited sixteenth track, "Freedom."
 Chaos and Creation in the Backyard: An instrumental, "I've Only Got Two Hands," is heard after the end of "Anyway."
 New: "Scared" after the end of "Road." On the album's Deluxe Edition, it appears after the end of "Get Me Out of Here."
 Jesse McCartney, Beautiful Soul: After the track "The Stupid Things," the hidden track "Good Life" starts to play.
 McFly, Room on the Third Floor (2004): A hidden track, "Get Over You," previously released as a B-side, appears in the pregap of the first track.
 Motion in the Ocean (2006): A hidden track, "Silence Is a Scary Sound," appears after approximately five minutes of silence at the end of track 12, "Don't Stop Me Now."
 Above the Noise (2010): Numerous clips throughout the album, including the riff from "Supreme" in "I Need a Woman."
 Pat McGee Band, Shine: Immediately after the title track ends, an instrumental reprise of "I Know" begins. It was split into a separate track for its release on the iTunes Music Store.
 Stephanie McIntosh, Tightrope (2006): "I'd Be You" is located 60 seconds after the album's final song, "The Night of My Life," ends.
 Sarah McLachlan, Fumbling Towards Ecstasy: a solo piano version of "Possession" after silence at the end of the album.
 The Freedom Sessions: a solo piano version of "Hold On" appears a couple minutes after "Ol' 55."
 Mclusky:
 My Pain and Sadness is More Sad and Painful Than Yours: "Evil Frankie" at the end of the final track (5:10 into World Cup Drumming)
 Mclusky Do Dallas: "Reviewing the Reviewers" after the final track
 Meat Loaf, Couldn't Have Said It Better: "Mercury Blues" approximately 2 minutes after the end of "Forever Young"
 Meat Puppets, Too High to Die: An unlisted remake of "Lake of Fire" (originally on Meat Puppets II) begins at 3:46 of the final song on the album, "Comin' Down."
 Megadeth, Capitol Punishment: The Megadeth Years: Untitled collage of Megadeth's music, approximately 33 seconds after the end of "Peace Sells," at the end of the album. (In the Japanese version this track is not hidden but is instead track 16.)
 Mêlée: Everyday Behavior: Untitled song at the end of track 11, approximately 2:10 after the end of "Pennsylvania"
 John Mellencamp:
 Big Daddy: Cover version of The Hombres' "Let It All Hang Out" at the end of track 11, "J.M.'s Question
 Freedom's Road: Song about George W. Bush titled "Rodeo Clown" at the end of track 10, "Heaven is a Lonely Place"
 Melt-Banana, Teeny Shiny: Untitled track at the end of the album
 Melys: Casting Pearls: Untitled instrumental track hidden in the pregap of the first track.
 Natalie Merchant, Ophelia: Orchestral reprise of "Ophelia" following the last track
 Mercury Rev, Deserter's Songs: Untitled track at the end of the album
 MercyMe, Coming Up to Breathe: "Have Fun" begins after a long silence at the end of "I Would Die For You."
 Merz (musician): Loveheart: 'The Winter Song' appears after a silent gap on the last track 'Loveheart'.
 Merzbow, Merzbient, disc 2: Untitled track number 2 is unlisted on the back cover.
 Meshuggah, None: The hidden kicks can be heard at the end of the final track.
 Metallica, Garage Inc., disc 1: After 30–60 seconds of silence, Metallica jam to the later half of Robin Trower's Bridge of Sighs at the end of Track 11: "The More I See" by Discharge.
 Garage Inc., disc 2 (The $5.98 E.P. - Garage Days Re-Revisited): At the end of "Last Caress/Green Hell," there is a mock performance of the intro to Iron Maiden's Run to the Hills which fades out.
 Method of Escape, Method of Escape (2014): "To Keep You" starts playing after the last track "Broken Jar" ends.
 Metz, Metz: "--))--" is the unlisted final track.
 MewithoutYou, [A→B] Life After approximately 5:00 of complete silence (starting at 5:43), an abruptly-starting acoustic version of the song "I Never Said I Was Brave" is sung by guitarist Mike Weiss.
 Mew, Half the World Is Watching Me The song "Ending" can be found on the first issue of the album by rewinding past 0:00 on the first track "Am I Wry? No."
 No More Stories...: When the first track, "New Terrain," is reversed, it reveals a hidden track called "Nervous."
 Micachu, Jewellery (album): After the final track on CD version, song "Hardcore" appears after 20 minutes of silence.
 George Michael, Songs from the Last Century: After the last track and a few minutes of silence the listener will hear "It's All Right with Me."
 Midnight Oil, Scream in Blue: track 13 is an unlisted 5:04 acoustic version of "Burnie"
 The Mighty Mighty Bosstones, Ska-Core, the Devil, and More: A live version of "Howwhywuz Howwhyam" after the final track "Drugs and Kittens"/"I'll Drink to That," preceded by a few minutes of silence
 Mika, Life in Cartoon Motion (2007): A hidden track, "Over My Shoulder," appears at 5:43 minutes in track 10's love ballad, "Happy Ending." On the UK release, a bonus track called "Ring Ring" is featured after the entire track 10 as track 11, making "Over My Shoulder" appear before the album has ended.
 Ministry, Dark Side of the Spoon: "Everybody" as track 42 (Unofficially titled as "Linda Summertime")
 Houses of the Molé: "Psalm 23" as track 23, an alternative version of "No W" without Carmina Burana samples, preceded by a rendition of The Star-Spangled Banner. Later versions of album include "No W" without Carmina Burana samples and "Psalm 23" is replaced by the track "Bloodlines" (composed for Vampire: The Masquerade - Bloodlines game). Also, there is a second hidden song at track 69, called "Walrus."
 Rio Grande Blood: Unlisted 13th track which is "Gangreen" intro without guitars.
 Cover Up: hidden tracks "What A Wonderful World (Short Slow Version)", "What A Wonderful World (Short Fast Version)" and "Willie Stigmata" play at tracks 23, 44 and 69 after several tracks containing 4 seconds of silence.
 Dannii Minogue:
 Girl: A cover version of Harry Nilsson's song "Coconut" is hidden at the end of the album, after "Movin' Up."
 Neon Nights: A remix of "Come and Get It" (Sebastian Krieg Remix) appears after closing track, "It Won't Work Out."
 Kylie Minogue, Light Years: "Password" hidden in the album's pregap
 Minor Threat, Out of Step: Untitled track at end of side 2 on vinyl and cassette release. Track is listed as Cashing in on CD release and Complete Discography
 Mint Condition, Life's Aquarium: The hidden bonus tracks "DeCuervo's Revenge" and "If We Play Our Cards Right" start at the end of the last song "Leave Me Alone" following two minutes of silence.
 Mistle Thrush, Agus Amàrach: After 21 tracks of silence following the final credited song, there is an untitled 2:10 ambient wash of sound spread across five tracks.
 The Misfits, American Psycho: "Hell Night" starts about 5 minutes after the last listed track, "Don't Open 'til Doomsday." On the vinyl version this track is replaced with "Dead kings rise", which is not the demo version the is available on "Cuts from the crypt".
 Kim Mitchell, Ain't Life Amazing There is a brief pause at the end of the eneventh track, before "Fill your head with rock" begins to play. This song is not listed on the packaging.
 Super Refraction: On the final track of the album, after the credited song ends, there is 1:30 of silence, followed by a 22:32 sound collage pieced together from samples of the singer's vocals.
 Moby, Hotel: The fifteenth track is an unlisted slow instrumental called "35 Minutes."
 Last Night: "Lucy Vida" is hidden after a brief amount of silence following the last track on the album.
 Modest Mouse: "Sad Sappy Sucker": Of the 24 tracks on the CD, only 23 are listed, with an extra song—"Classy Plastic Lumber"—inserted as track four, off-setting the track numbers for the remainder of the songs.
 Modjo, Modjo: An acoustic version of "Lady (Hear Me Tonight)" was played after the final track, "Savior Eyes".
 moe., Dither: An alternate version of "Captain America" starts after roughly 14 minutes of silence following the album-ending "Opium."
 Mouse on Mars, Vulvaland: An untitled track after several minutes of silence lasting 6:05 in duration.
 The Moffatts, Submodalities: There are two tracks hidden within the deceptively long (24:43 mins) final listed track, "Spy," appearing at 11:52 ("Destiny") and 22:04 ("Kill the Seagull," also known as the "Submodalities Chant" before the name was released) respectively.
 Moloko, Do You Like My Tight Sweater?: Untitled track after the last track, "Who Shot the Go Go Dancer"
 Monaco, Music For Pleasure The song "Sedona" ends at minute 5:50. At minute 6:50, after 1 minute of silence, begins a brief hidden track: it's an outro message that says "Oi! You can turn it off now".
 Mono Puff, It's Fun to Steal: A untitled track appears in the pregap before the first track.
 Monrose, Ladylike: "I Surrender" appear at 5:18 of "Mono."
 Monster Magnet, Dopes to Infinity: On the CD version, an extended noise piece, "Forbidden Planet," appears at the end of the album following several minutes of silence. The song also appears on the two-disc LP version (filling the entire second side of the second disc) and as a B-side.
 Monster Magnet, Tab: Some releases of the album include two tracks, "Murder" and "Tractor," which are not listed on the cover. Both tracks had appeared earlier on their eponymous debut album.
 Gary Moore, A Different Beat After the last track and a few minutes silence you will hear another version of "Surrender"
 Dark Days in Paradise: Untitled track at end of album following "Business as Usual" - on the remaster it is credited; it is actually the title track of the CD, "Dark Days In Paradise"
 Geoff Moore & the Distance: Threads: A cover of Sly and the Family Stone's "Stand!" following the final track "The Letter."
 Morbid Angel, Heretic: The album has 30 unlisted tracks, most are silent, four contain isolated guitar leads, one is ambient, and one is an instrumental version of another song on the album.
 Alanis Morissette:
 Jagged Little Pill: Track 13 contains an alternate take of "You Oughta Know" and, following silence, at 5:12, "Your House," a solo a cappella song which she performed at the 1996 MTV Video Music Awards.
 Jagged Little Pill Acoustic: Track 12 "Wake Up" is followed by silence and at 6:18 "Your House" accompanied by instruments.
 Supposed Former Infatuation Junkie: a demo of "Uninvited," with only pianos and vocals at the end of the Australian edition of the album.
 Mortician, The Final Bloodbath Session: Track 28 is unlisted on the back cover.
 The Move, Looking On: After the last song, "Feel Too Good," has finished, an unlisted song titled "The Duke of Edinburgh's Lettuce" begins.
 The Movement, Set Sail: Following the final track, "Kind," Jordan Miller performs a solo acoustic song titled "Breathe."
 Mr. Bungle:
 OU818: At the end of the tape you can hear outtakes from the Intro of "Mr. Nice Guy" with all the band members cracking up in laughter.
 Disco Volante: "The Secret Song" (labeled "Spy" in setlists). On the CD, this song plays on track 3 after the listed song, "Carry Stress in the Jaw." On the vinyl LP, this song is recorded on a separate groove between the grooves of "Carry Stress in the Jaw" — the record needle must be manually moved to hear it. There is also a hidden track at the end of the final song, "Merry Go Bye Bye," which seems to be a recording of the band jamming.
 Jason Mraz: At the end of the Mr. A-Z CD, after Song For a Friend a song plays with a church choir singing.
 Ms. Dynamite: Follow the last track "Ramp" is about two minutes of silence, followed by "Get Up, Stand Up!"
 Mudhoney, My Brother the Cow: "woC eht rehtorB yM," 13th unlisted track, which is the whole album played backwards (tracks 12 to 1 in reverse)
 Municipal Waste (band): At the end of the Waste 'em All CD, there is a sixteenth song after the song titled "Mountain Wizard." It is about flying a kite.
 Muse:
 Hullabaloo Soundtrack: "What He's Building," a poem read by Tom Waits, is hidden in the pregap of the second disc.
 Random 1-8: Three hidden remixes of "Sunburn" at the end.
 Starlight: A hidden song, which is referred to as fans and the band as "You Fucking Motherfucker" can be found by placing the DVD version into a DVD player and going to Title 4.
 HAARP: On the H.A.A.R.P. DVD, Sing For Absolution is a hidden track on Title 2. While on the CD, the a riff from the song "Maggie's Farm" is played at the end of track 5, "Map of the Problematique."
 Absolution Tour: Various other live performances are hidden on the DVD. When in the Extras menu, go down to 'Stockholm Syndrome', press the left button and the 'X' in 'Extras' should light up. Then press play. On the US release of the Black Holes and Revelations album + the Absolution Tour as a bonus disc, when in the extras menu, go down to "Groove in the States" and then press right (or left, depending on your remote) and the 'X' in 'Extras' should light up, press play and they will play.
 Mushroomhead:
 Mushroomhead: Untitled hidden track number 43 (tracks 14-42 are 5 seconds each of blank audio). This is a mash-up of some of the tracks, including Slow Thing, Too Much Nothing, Indifferent, 2nd Thoughts, Mommy and 43.
 M3: Track number 99 "Dark And Evil Joe" (tracks 11-98 are 7 seconds each of blank audio). This is a prank phone call.
 XX: A hidden prank phone call starts sometime after the freestyle rap of JMann. This is only available on the Eclipse Records release of the album.
 XIII: A cover of Seal's "Crazy" is at about 5:25 of the end of the final track.
 Kacey Musgraves, Pageant Material: Musgraves' cover of "Are You Sure" by Willie Nelson is a part of track 13, "Fine", on CD pressings of the album and on Spotify (giving track 13 a length of 7:50), but a separate track on all other digital platforms. The song features vocals from Nelson.
 The Music:
 The Music Limited Edition CD: "New Instrumental" hidden in the pregap for 5:09 before track 1
 Welcome to the North: 'The Walls Get Smaller' is hidden after silence at the end of the last track 'Open Your Mind'
 Strength in Numbers: 'No Danger' is found after a silent gap at the end of the last track 'Inconceivable Odds'
 MxPx, Secret Weapon: "Song About Nothing" is after the last track ("Throw Your Body in the Air" in the special edition, otherwise "Tightly Wound").
 My Chemical Romance, The Black Parade: Track called "Blood" hidden at the end of the album, on track 14 at 1:30.
 My Little Pony, Winning Streak (1995): There is a pregap consisting that Howie b. Reynolds talking about Yom Kippur... also used on Less Than Jake's Losing Streak Album.
Anthem (2004): After the bonus track on the cassette edition, there's a track which consists that the Cutie Mark Crusaders thinking the hidden track should start... but it didn't. Followed by 2 minute silence. After all that, there's the demo version of "The Ghost of You and Me" which is recorded at the summer of 2003.
 Mr. Spring: "Not for Sale" on the 8-track Cart edition 2008 . Track called "Aquarious" left off original CD master and another 6 unnamed tracks on the cart issue to fill the tapes. Cat IRT404/08
 Mor ve Ötesi, Dünya Yalan Söylüyor (The World is Lying) (2004) 230.000+ copies sold in TR: Track called "Uyan" hidden at the end of the album on track 10, "27:26 Minutes"
 Mystery Jets, Twenty One: Twenty One appears after two minutes' silence on the final track.

See also
 List of backmasked messages
 List of albums with tracks hidden in the pregap

References 

M